Americana Manhasset is an upscale, open-air shopping mall located in Manhasset, in Nassau County, on Long Island, in New York, United States. It is located along a stretch of Northern Boulevard commonly referred to as the Miracle Mile of Manhasset.

History 
Developed by Gerace & Castagna, Incorporated, the Americana Manhasset opened in 1956, and was transformed into the world-class shopping destination that is today through a major re-design in the 1980s. Leading luxury flagship architect Peter Marino has served as the master architect since the center's transformation.

As one of Long Island's most luxurious shopping malls, the Americana Manhasset includes several upscale brands, such as Hermès, Dior, Cartier, Bottega Veneta, Chanel, Fendi, Gucci, Louis Vuitton, MaxMara, Celine, Tiffany & Co., and Prada, with walkways that are surrounded by gardens designed by Oheme van Sweden. Peter Marino is Americana Manhasset's master architect.

Past stores include Escada, Yves St. Laurent, Charles Jourdan, Barneys and Waldbaums, amongst others.

List of stores 
Brands including Hermès, Dior, Cartier, Bottega Veneta, Chanel, Fendi, Gucci, Louis Vuitton, MaxMara, Celine, Audemars Piguet, Brunello Cucinelli, Burberry, Christian Louboutin, David Yurman, Ermenegildo Zegna, Hugo Boss, Jimmy Choo, Kiton, Saint Laurent, Salvatore Ferragamo, Tesla, Versace, Van Cleef & Arpels, Valentino, Vilebrequin among the more than 60 luxury stores located at the exclusive shopping center.

In popular culture 
The shopping mall is referenced in the book Manhasset Stories, by Suzanne McLain Rosenwasser.

References

External links

Americana Manhasset (official web site)

Manhasset, New York
Shopping malls established in 1956
Shopping malls in Nassau County, New York
Shopping malls in the New York metropolitan area